Livonia Engine was a General Motors engine factory in Livonia, Michigan. It is located at 12200 Middlebelt Rd and opened in 1971. The plant closed in June 2010.

Products
 GM Premium V engine

References

General Motors factories
Motor vehicle assembly plants in Michigan
Livonia, Michigan
1971 establishments in Michigan
2010 disestablishments in Michigan